Luis Alfredo Marte (born August 26, 1986) is an American former professional baseball player. He played in Major League Baseball (MLB) for the Detroit Tigers.

Minor Leagues
Marte was signed by the Tigers in 2005 at the age of 19.  In 2006, he posted a 1.38 ERA while throwing 90 strikeouts in 60 innings for the Tigers Dominican Summer League affiliate.

In 2007 the Tigers transferred Marté to their Gulf Coast League affiliate in Lakeland, Florida where he went 2–0 with a 0.75 ERA in two starts. He was then moved to the (A) West Michigan Whitecaps where he posted a 2.83 ERA working primarily out of the bullpen.

Marté pitched at three levels in 2008, compiling a 1.98 ERA in seven starts for the (A) Lakeland Flying Tigers.  He was then moved to (AA) Erie where he compiled a 5.05 ERA in ten starts for the Seawolves. Meanwhile, his strikeout rate per nine innings went from 9.0 in Lakeland to 5.1 in Erie.

In 2009 for Erie, Marte posted a 4.02 ERA in  innings and a 5.06 ERA in 48 innings at the same level in 2010.

He rebounded nicely pitching for the Seawolves again in 2011, compiling a 3-0 record with a 1.70 ERA in 53 innings primarily out of the bullpen.  He was also able to improve his strikeout per nine ratio to an impressive 11.55.

Major Leagues
Marte was promoted to the Major League level on September 1, 2011. For the remainder of the season, he compiled a 1-0 record with a 2.45 ERA in 3.2 innings of relief for the Tigers.

He was invited to Spring Training with the Tigers in March 2012, where he compiled a 2-0 record and a 2.08 ERA in nine Grapefruit League appearances. As a result, he was named to the Major League roster on Friday March 30, 2012. However, the following Tuesday, during the Tigers final Grapefruit League game, he suffered a hamstring injury and was forced to start the season on the Disabled List. Marte pitched in 2 rehab assignments before being activated off the 15-day DL on May 25. Luke Putkonen was optioned to Triple-A to make room. During June 2013, Marte underwent right shoulder surgery, which ended his 2013 season.

On December 11, 2013, Marte was designated for assignment to make room on the 40-man roster for Rajai Davis. He cleared waivers on December 16 and was assigned to Toledo. He was released by the Tigers on March 12, 2014.

References

External links

1986 births
Living people
Detroit Tigers players
Dominican Republic expatriate baseball players in the United States
Dominican Summer League Tigers players
Erie SeaWolves players
Gulf Coast Tigers players
Lakeland Flying Tigers players

Major League Baseball pitchers
Major League Baseball players from the Dominican Republic
Mesa Solar Sox players
Toledo Mud Hens players
Tigres del Licey players
West Michigan Whitecaps players